Asmahur-e Sofla (also Romanized as Asmāhūr-e Soflá; also known as Esmāhūr-e Pā’īn) is a village in Borborud-e Sharqi Rural District, in the Central District of Aligudarz County, Lorestan Province, Iran. At the 2006 census, its population was 110, in 23 families.

References 

Towns and villages in Aligudarz County